Los Músicos de Su Alteza is a Spanish early music ensemble founded by the Saragosse harpsichordist Luis Antonio González in 1992. The ensemble has taken a particular lead in recording music from the archives of Zaragoza's two cathedrals, La Seo and El Pilar, and performs regularly at the Música Antigua Aranjuez festival.

Discography
 In Ictu Oculi. Música española del siglo XVII. Arsis, 1996
 La música en La Seo de Zaragoza (Book & CD) Prames
 Joan Cabanilles Tientos Y Passacalles Villancico Mortales que amais. Dorian 1999
 Terra Tremuit. Música española del siglo XVII para la Semana Santa Arsis, 2000
 José de Nebra Miserere scene from El Diablo mudo Ediciones Música Antigua de Aranjuez, 2006. MAA 005
 Joseph Ruiz Samaniego La vida es sueno Alpha 2010
 José de Nebra Amor aumenta el Valor (1728) Alpha 2011
 Il tormento e l'estasi - Luigi Rossi Il peccator pentito Domenico Mazzocchi Pentito si rivolge a Dio. Giacomo Carissimi Jephte Alpha 2012.
The ensemble has also conducted performances of Doña María Bárbara de Portugal, que goza de Dios (1758), Nebra's La divina Filotea (1745), and Siete Palabras de Cristo en la Cruz by Francisco García Fajer.

References

Early music groups